Thiruvaduthurai Adheenam is a Saivite mutt based in the town of Thiruvaduthurai in Kuthalam taluk of Mayiladuthurai District, Tamil Nadu, India. The adheenam maintains the Mayuranathaswami temple at Mayiladuthurai. As of 1987, there were a total of 15 Shiva temples under the control of the adheenam.

Activities
The Adheenam is involved in publishing Saivite literature, specifically Thevaram and Tiruvasakam and its translations. It is also involved in literary scholarship. Some of the prominent Tamil literary personalities like Meenakshi Sundaram Pillai had their tutorship in the Adheenam. His disciple U V Swaminatha Iyer, who published many Tamil classical texts also was associated with the organization. The Adheenam along with Thiruppanandal Adheenam and Dharmapuram Adheenam were founded during the 16th century to spread the ideology of Saiva Sidhantam.

In connection with India's Independence in August 14, 1947 the then chief priest of this Adheenam Srila Sri Ambalavana Desika Swamikal performed special Shiva pujas and presented the first PM of the Indian Union Shri. Pandit Jawaharlal Nehru, a bejeweled golden sceptre worth then Rs. 15,000/- at his home in Delhi.

Rajaji was an ardent follower of this adheenam

References 

Hindu monasteries in India
Shaivism
Aadheenams